Pulchriphyllium giganteum, commonly known as the Giant Malaysian Leaf insect, is a species of leaf insects described from Malaysia by Hausleithner in 1984 and placed in the genus Pulchriphyllium since 2021. Pulchriphyllium giganteum is the largest species belonging to the genus Pulchriphyllium reaching 105 mm in size. They are found most abundantly in the west Malaysian tropics. The females typically have large elytra that lie edge to edge on the abdomen and tend to lack hind wings making them usually flightless. Males have small elytra and sometimes transparent non-leaflike functional hind wings. Pulchriphyllium giganteum found in the wild tend to be mostly females and the first male of this species was not found until 1994. In captivity, the species has primarily been observed to reproduce through parthenogenesis meaning the females are asexual. The primary reproductive pattern in the wild is unknown. Eggs tend to be brown or black and glossy and resemble seeds. They hatch around 6 months after breeding. Newly hatched young nymphs tend to be wingless and brown or reddish in color. They develop their green color after feeding on leaves. Both the adult and larval stages are phytophagous meaning they feed on plants. The main plant food sources for this species are oak and bramble tree leaves.

There are no known subspecies; this insect has proved to be popular for rearing in captivity.

Gallery

References

External links

Phylliidae
Insects described in 1984
Phasmatodea of Malesia